Cheenu Mohan (17 May 1956 – 27 December 2018) was an Indian actor who appeared in Tamil language films. He acted in films including Thalapathi (1991) and Iraivi (2016).

Career
Mohan began his career as a stage actor in the late 1970s, portrayed as a lead role in plays written by Crazy Mohan. His character name of 'Cheenu' in Crazy Mohan plays, became an identification mark of him since then. After portraying a small role in Varusham Padhinaaru (1989), Mani Ratnam's Anjali (1990) and Thalapathi (1991). His involvement in theatre and his reluctance to move into television roles, meant that roles in the film industry had evaded him.

He made a comeback by portraying a supporting role in Karthik Subbaraj's multi-starrer Iraivi (2016). Featuring as the antiques dealer John, who tries to hold together a breaking family, Cheenu Mohan received critical acclaim for his work in the film. A critic called his performance "fantastic in the melodramatic scenes". Appreciation for his performance in the film meant that he was later selected to feature in Manikandan's Aandavan Kattalai (2016) and Vetrimaaran's Vada Chennai (2017).

Death
Mohan died on 27 December 2018 due to cardiac arrest.

Filmography

Theatre
Some of popular Tamil dramas as an actor are listed below.

 Maadhu +2
 Jurassic Baby
 Marriage Made in Saloon
 Meesai Aanaalum Manaivi
 Alaavudeenum 100 Watts Bulbum
 Crazy Kishkintha
 Return of Crazy Thieves
 Madhu Cheenu
 Kalyanam Panni Ppaar
 Kudumbam (Pirithu) Nadathi Paar
 Veetai (Maatri) Katti Paar
 Oru Babiyin Diary Kurippu
 Kathalikka Maadhu Undu
 Maadhu Mirandal
 Madhil Mel Maadhu
 Chocolate Krishna
 Satellite Saamiyaar
 Google Gadothgajan

Television series
 Marmadesam Ragasiyam
 Madhil Mel Madhu
 Marriage Made In Saloon
 Return of Crazy Thieves
 Madhu plus 2
 Aachi International
 Crazy Times
 Vidathu Sirippu (2004)
 Maadhu Cheenu
 Nil Gavani Crazy (Sun TV)
Annamalai(Sun TV)

References

1956 births
2018 deaths
Male actors in Tamil cinema
21st-century Indian male actors
20th-century Indian male actors
Tamil male actors
Tamil comedians
Indian male comedians
Tamil male television actors